The diocese of Kondoa (in Latin: Dioecesis Kondoaënsis) is a see of the Roman Catholic Church suffragan of the Archdiocese of Dodoma. In 2011 it counted 46,067 baptized among 541,345 inhabitants. Its current bishop is Bernardin Mfumbusa.

Territory 
The diocese corresponds to the Kondoa District, in Tanzania.

The see is located in the city of Kondoa, since 2011 and the construction of the cathedral of the Holy Spirit.

The territory is divided into 9 parishes.

History 
The diocese was created on March 12, 2011 by the Papal bull Cum ad provehendam of Pope Benedict XVI, taking territories from the Roman Catholic Diocese of Dodoma.

Chronology of the bishops 
 Bernardin Mfumbusa, since March 12, 2011

Statistics 
The diocese counted 541,345 inhabitants at its creation, among whom 46,067 were baptized, which is 8.5%.

|-
| 2011 || 46.067 || 541.345 || 8,5 || 17 || 15 || 2 || 2.710 ||  || 0 || 87 || 9
|}

External links 
 The diocese on Catholic-hierarchy
  Creation of the diocese
 Bull Cum ad provehendam

Kondoa
Kondoa District
Kondoa